The Saikyō Line is a Japanese railway line operated by the East Japan Railway Company (JR East). It connects Ōsaki Station in Shinagawa, Tokyo, and Ōmiya Station in Saitama Prefecture. The line's name is an abbreviation of the two areas the line connects: Saitama and Tōkyō.

Beside the link that connects the Saikyō and Rinkai lines is the JR East Tokyo General Rolling Stock Centre that stores the rolling stock for the Yamanote Line and other types of rolling stock; and the Hinkaku Line which links Saikyo Line to the Tokaido Freight Line and Sotetsu-JR Link Line.

Basic data
Operator: East Japan Railway Company (JR East) (Services and tracks)
Ōsaki – Ikebukuro – Akabane – Musashi-Urawa – Ōmiya: 
Ōsaki – Ikebukuro:  (Yamanote Line freight line)
Ikebukuro – Akabane:  (Akabane Line)
Akabane – Musashi-Urawa – Ōmiya:  (Tōhoku Main Line branch)
Double-tracking: Entire line
Railway signalling:
Ōsaki – Ikebukuro: Automatic Block System, ATS-P
Ikebukuro – Ōmiya: ATACS, Formerly ATC-6
Maximum speed:
Akabane – Ōmiya: 
Itabashi – Akabane: 
All other sections:

Route
The line runs parallel to the Yamanote Line between Ōsaki and Ikebukuro, where it is formally called the Yamanote Freight Line(), and as an alternate route to the Tōhoku Main Line between Akabane and Ōmiya, where it is unofficially called the Tohoku Honsen Secondary Line(). The portion between Ikebukuro and Akabane is officially known as the Akabane Line(). For most purposes, JR refers to all of these as part of the "Saikyō Line" when being used for Saikyō Line services.

Service
There are three types of trains on the Saikyō Line: "Local"(), "Rapid"(), and "Commuter Rapid"(). Between Akabane and Musashi-Urawa, Rapid trains stop only at Toda-Kōen, while Commuter Rapid trains, which run during rush hours, stop only at Musashi-Urawa between Akabane and Ōmiya. Between Akabane and Ikebukuro, as well as on the Kawagoe and Rinkai lines, all trains stop at all stations. Between Ikebukuro and Osaki on the Yamanote Freight Line, all trains run limited-stop in both directions, with the Yamanote Line providing all-stations service.

Station list
 Local trains stop at all stations.
 Rapid and commuter rapid trains stop at stations marked "●" and pass those marked "｜".

Rolling stock
 JR East 205 series (x1) 10-car EMU (July 1989-October 2016)
 JR East E233-7000 series 10-car EMUs (since June 2013)
 TWR 70-000 series 10-car EMUs (since 1996)
 Sotetsu 12000 series 10-car EMUs (since 30 November 2019)

Per 30 November 2019 schedule change, services on the Saikyo Line, Kawagoe Line, Rinkai Line, and Sōtetsu Main Line are operated by a fleet of 38 10-car E233-7000 series electric multiple unit (EMU) trains owned by JR East and based at Kawagoe Depot, 10-car TWR 70-000 series EMU trains owned by Tokyo Waterfront Area Rapid Transit and based at Yashio Depot; and 5 sets of Sotetsu 12000 series owned by Sagami Railway and based at Kashiwadai Vehicle Center. The first E233-7000 series trains were delivered in March 2013, entering revenue service from 1 June 2013, gradually displacing the 205 series sets used since 1 July 1989. , all Saikyo Line 205 series sets have been removed from service. With the opening of the Sotetsu-JR Link Line, Sotetsu 12000 series trains begin traveling through to Saikyo Line (via Shonan-Shinjuku Line).

Before the establishment of the Saikyo Line, rolling stock used on the Akabane Line included:
 72 series 8-car EMUs (1953–1967)
 101 series 8-car EMUs (1967–1978)
 103 series 8/10-car EMUs (1978–1985)

History
The Akabane Line opened on 1 March 1885 as a segment of the Nippon Railway Shinagawa Line. The company was nationalized in 1906. Electric services on the line began in 1909. From 1972 to 1985, the line was the known as the Akabane Line after being a branch of Yamanote Line.

Before the Saikyo Line, there were several attempts to improve commuter rail service between Saitama and Tokyo. One of the earliest, the Tokyo-Ōmiya Electric Railway, was founded in 1928 but went bankrupt shortly thereafter due to rising land values in the area. Later, in 1968, the Tokyo Metropolitan Board of Transportation proposed to run the new Toei Mita Line to central Ōmiya.

Development of the Saikyo Line began as a Japanese National Railways effort to quell unrest in Saitama regarding the expansion of the Tohoku and Joetsu Shinkansen. During the mid-1970s, local protesters staged sit-ins, demonstrations, and administrative actions to impede the building of the new high-speed lines north of Tokyo. JNR reached a settlement with the activists under which it would build a commuter line to serve these local communities, while being allowed to continue extending the Shinkansen.

The new line, tentatively called the "New Commuter Line"(), was built between Ōmiya and Akabane. Through service to Ikebukuro via the existing Akabane Line began on 30 September 1985. The Akabane Line name disappeared from daily use from this time. The Saikyo Line was initially troubled by inadequate train control systems which could not keep pace with its frequency of service; however, these issues were worked out during the first month of service.

When the Tōhoku Main Line portion of the Saikyō Line was being built, the stations from Kita-Akabane to Kita-Yono were designated with numbers from 1 to 10; Kita-Akabane Station was known as "New Commuter Line Station No. 1". However, even after names were assigned, passengers complained that each station looked just like the next due to their identical construction. As a result, JNR, in an unusual move, assigned colors to those stations so that they could be told apart from one another.

On 3 March 1986, the Saikyo Line began through service to Shinjuku via the Yamanote Freight Line, which had seen less use by freight services since the opening of the Musashino Line in 1973. Freight services on the former Akabane Line ended in 1999. Services southward to Shibuya and Ebisu did not begin until 16 March 1996, when new platforms were completed to accommodate passenger service. Through services to Ōsaki and the Rinkai Line began on 1 December 2002.

The Saikyo Line has had a particularly severe problem of overcrowding during peak periods, especially during weekday mornings. The opening of the Shonan-Shinjuku Line in 2004 and the Tokyo Metro Fukutoshin Line in 2008, both of which parallel the Saikyō Line for part of its route, alleviated some of the worst crowding. Problems resulting from overcrowding have included a higher incidence of groping, as well as delays in train schedule caused by longer time taken at each station to pick up and drop off passengers. The Saikyō Line was notorious for having the highest reported number of groping-related incidents (known as chikan incidents) in the Greater Tokyo area. This problem was directly addressed by introducing women-only passenger cars during rush hours, and indirectly addressed by reducing overcrowding problems as a whole.

On 20 August 2016, station numbering was introduced with stations being assigned station numbers between JA08 and JA26. Numbers increase towards in the northbound direction towards Omiya.

Beginning 30 November 2019, some Saikyo Line trains travel through to  via the Shonan-Shinjuku Line and the Sotetsu JR-Link Line. In the westbound direction (Omiya to Shinjuku, Osaki, and Ebina), Saikyo Line trains enter the Hinkaku Line after Osaki, stopping at Nishi-Oi and Musashi-Kosugi. After Musashi-Kosugi, trains enter the Tokaido Freight Line track. Near , the train enters the Sotetsu-JR Link Line.

References

Notes

Further reading

External links

 Stations of the Saikyō Line (JR East) 

 
Lines of East Japan Railway Company
Railway lines in Tokyo
Rail transport in Saitama Prefecture
1067 mm gauge railways in Japan
Railway lines opened in 1985
1985 establishments in Japan